Aloha Camp is a summer camp for girls on Lake Morey in Fairlee, Vermont.  Founded in 1905, it is the oldest girls' camp in the state.  Open to children aged 12 to 17, it offers outdoor activities, arts and nature programs, and wilderness camping opportunities.  The camp season is divided into two sessions of 3-1/2 weeks, running from late June to mid-August.  The camp property is listed on the National Register of Historic Places.

Facilities
Aloha Camp is located on central eastern Vermont, on the northwestern shore of Lake Morey, in the hills north of Fairlee village just west of the Connecticut River. The camp layout is focused on the Main House and a number of activity buildings, with living quarters spread around the property. The Main House is an 1889 farmhouse, while the main activity buildings are repurposed agricultural outbuildings from the late 19th century. On the waterfront stands the Hale (pronounced in the Hawaiian manner, HAH-leh), an Adirondack style meeting hall with some Hawaiian stylistic touches.

History
The camp was founded in 1905 by Harriet Farnsworth Gulick and Edward Leeds Gulick, both of whom grew up in missionary families with a history of service.  The camp was named "Aloha" from the Hawaiian word meaning "welcome" (among other definitions).  Edward Gulick was born and raised in Honolulu, and it is from this upbringing that the camp acquires its Hawaiian touches.  The camp was so successful that the Gulicks soon opened Aloha Hive Camp on Lake Fairlee, for girls from 7 to 12 and Aloha Club on the shore of Lake Katherine in Piermont, New Hampshire, for girls from 17 to 70 (now closed), and in 1922 Lanakila Camp for boys, also on Lake Morey.  The camps were run by members of the Gulick family until 1968, when the Aloha Foundation was established to continue their legacy.

See also
National Register of Historic Places listings in Orange County, Vermont

References

External links
Aloha Camp web site

Historic districts on the National Register of Historic Places in Vermont
National Register of Historic Places in Orange County, Vermont
Queen Anne architecture in Vermont
Buildings and structures completed in 1905
Buildings and structures in Fairlee, Vermont
Summer camps in Vermont
Temporary populated places on the National Register of Historic Places
1905 establishments in Vermont